The Maserati Tipo 26 was a model of Grand Prix racing car and was the first car built by Italian manufacturer Maserati, for a total of 11 examples, between 1926 and 1932.

The Tipo 26 originated from a Grand Prix car that Alfieri Maserati had designed for Diatto: when the collaboration between Maserati and Diatto ended, Alfieri took his design to the Bologna workshop that he had set up with his brothers in 1914.

The design of the Tipo 26 consisted of a steel ladder-type frame supporting a supercharged inline-8 engine with a three-speed manual transmission and an aluminum two-seater bodywork made by Medardo Fantuzzi.

The engine featured a crankshaft-driven Roots supercharger, twin gear-driven overhead camshafts and dry sump lubrication; to comply with the 1926 Grand Prix regulations the displacement was fixed to 1.5-litres.

At its debut race in the 1926 Targa Florio, the Maserati Tipo 26, with Alfieri Maserati driving and a young Guerino Bertocchi as riding mechanic, finished first in the Grand Prix class and ninth overall.

Tipo 26 MM
For the 1928 Mille Miglia endurance race, two new chassis were fitted with roadster bodies featuring cycle wings, running boards, doors, headlights, a small windshield, a folding canvas top and two spare wheels mounted on the tail. Under the hood the engines were the same as found in the Tipo 26 Grand Prix. Those cars were known as Tipo 26 MM.

References

Tipo 26
Grand Prix cars